Rubén Ignacio Farfán Arancibia (born 25 September 1991), nicknamed Rayo (Lightning Bolt), is a Chilean footballer who plays for Coquimbo Unido as a winger.

Personal life
He is the nephew of Gerson Martínez, another professional footballer who played for Colo-Colo and Chile U20.

Honours

Club
Deportes Santa Cruz
 Tercera B (1): 2012

Universidad de Chile
 Copa Chile (1): 2015
 Supercopa de Chile (1): 2015

References

External links
 
 

1991 births
Living people
Chilean footballers
People from Quillota Province
Unión La Calera footballers
Deportes Santa Cruz footballers
Universidad de Chile footballers
C.D. Antofagasta footballers
Club Deportivo Palestino footballers
Santiago Wanderers footballers
Deportes Temuco footballers
Coquimbo Unido footballers
Unión Española footballers
Chilean Primera División players
Association football wingers